The following is a list of Lord mayors of the city of Port Louis on the island of Mauritius. The island was under French rule until 1810, when the British took power. Mauritius became independent in 1968.

 Thomas Enouf, 1790
 François Fressanges, 1791
 Louis Ricard de Bignicourt, 1791
 Louis Etienne Gilbert Grison de Marneville, 1792
 Henri Marie Salaün de Kerbalanec, 1793
 Pierre François Douaud, 1794
 Pierre François Marie Fabre, 1794
 Pierre Couturont (1795-1797)
 Claude Antoine Chauvet, 1798
 Auguste Journel, 1799 
 Sylvain Roux (1800-1803)
 Louis Léchelle, 1850-1853
 Sir Gabriel Froppier, 1854-1855
 Louis Léchelle, 1856
 Emile Pipon, 1856
 Hippolyte Lemière, 1857
 Arthur Edwards, 1858
 Pierre Nelsir Charon, 1859, 1865
 G. de Courson, 1860-1862
 Hippolyte Lemière, 1863-1864
 Pierre Nelsir Charon, 1865
 Charles Pitot, 1866-1867
 Eliaçin Francois, 1868-1869
 Emilien Ducray, 1870-1872
 Eliaçin Francois, 1873-1875
 G.F. Poulin, 1875-1876 
 L. Hily, 1877
 Emile Lanougarède Bazire, 1878-1881
 Alfred Lavoquer, 1882-1883 
 G.E. Thomy Pitot, 1884 
 Alfred Lavoquer, 1885-1886 
 G.V. K/Vern, 1887-1889 
 Edgar Aubert, 1889-1892 
 E. Duponsel, 1892 
 L. François, 1893-1895
 C.E. Thomy Pitot, 1897-1900 
 Eugène Laurent, 1905-1919
 Edgar Laurent 1920
 G. Edouard Nairac 1921-1922	
 G. Rozan 1922 
 Camile François 1923 
 G. Rozan 1923 
 Jérôme Tranquille 1924 
 Samuel Fouquereaux 1925 
 René Maigrot 1926 
 Alfred Gellé 1927 
 Edgar Laurent 1928-1929
 Arthur Rohan 1930
 Raoul Rochecouste 1931
 Samuel Fouquereaux 1932
 Jérôme Tranquille 1933
 Raoul Rivet 1934 & 1935
 Edgar Laurent	1936 
 Samuel Fouquereaux 1937 
 G.M.D. Atchia 1938 
 Jérôme Tranquille 1939 
 Samuel Fouquereaux 1940 
 Edgar Laurent	1941
 Samuel Fouquereaux 1942 
 Gabriel Martial 1943 
 Raoul Rivet 1944 
 Samuel Fouquereaux 1945 
 G.M.D. Atchia	1946
 Gabriel Martial 1947
 Raymond Hein 1948
 Abdool Razack Mohamed 1949 
 Félix Laventure 1950 
 Alex Bhujoharry 1951 
 Gabriel Martial 1952 
 Abdool Razack Mohamed 1953
 Jean Victor Ducasse 1954
 Jules Koenig	1955
 Robert Rey 1955 
 Abdool Razack Mohamed 1956 
 Edgard Millien 1956 
 Edgard Millien 1957
 Seewoosagur Ramgoolam, 1958-1959
 Guy Forget 1959
 Eddy J. Changkye, 1959-1960
 Hosseinbhaye Peerbaye	1961
 Raymond Devienne 1962
 Raymond Hein 1963 
 Monaf Fakira 1964 
 Alex Rima 1965	
 Dorsamy Moorghen 1966 
 Marc Fok Seung 1967 
 Norbert Poupard 1968-1969
 Gaetan Duval Mayor (1969-1971) and Lord Mayor (1971-1974)
 Vacant 1975-1976
 Kader Bhayat Lord Mayor, 1977
 Mathieu Ange Laclé 1978
 Krishna Baligadoo 1979 
 Vacant 1980-1982 
 Bashir Khodabux 1983-1984
 Noël Lee Cheong Lem 1985 
 Cassam Uteem 1986 
 Jérôme Boulle 1986-1988 
 Osman Gendoo 1988-1989 
 Dinesh Mundil 1989-1990 
 José Arunasalom 1990-1991 
 Jérôme Boulle 1991-1992 
 Ahmad Jeewah 1992-1994 
 Jean Claude Barbier 1994-1995
 Moganakaran Veerabadren	1995-1996 
 Mohammad Nanhuck 1996-1997 
 Luc Désiré Marie 1997-1998 
 Gérard Grivon 1998-1999 
 Soonildath Gopaul 1999-2000 
 Salim Abbas Mamode 2000-2001
 Moganakaran Veerabadren 2001-2002
 Michel Gérard Nina 2002-2003 
 Tirat Moossun 2003-2004 
 Abdullah Hafeez Hossen 2004-2005 
 Reza Goolam Mamode Issack 2005-2007
 Fritz Thomas 2007-2008
 Mahen Goondea 2008-2009 
 Sheikh Hossenbocus 2009-2010
 Mahmad Kodabaccus 2010-2012
 Aslam Hosenally 2012-2013 
 Dorine Chukowry 2013-2014 
 Yusuf Mohangee 2014
 Antonio Seedoo 2015 
 Oumar Kholeegan 2015-2017
 Daniel Laurent 2017–2019
 Moussa Cadersaib 2019-2020

See also
 Municipal City Council of Port Louis
 Timeline of Port Louis

References

This article incorporates information from the French Wikipedia.

Bibliography
 

Port Louis
 
Lists of political office-holders in Mauritius
port louis